Li Jian (born 23 September 1974) is a Chinese singer. His musical career began as one of the two founding members of the band "Shui Mu Nian Hua." After his departure from the band in 2002, he began his solo career. To date, he has produced nine albums. He is well known for his song "Chuan Qi" (Legend), which became a hit song after Chinese diva Faye Wong performed it on the 2010 Spring Gala.

In January 2015, Li Jian took part in Hunan Television's I Am a Singer Season 3, as the first substitute singer, and finished as runner-up, losing to Han Hong. However, he exploded in popularity due to his personality and musical style. On August 14, 2015, Li was selected to be a team adviser for Team Na Ying on The Voice of China (season 4), along with A-mei, G.E.M., and JJ Lin. In March 2017, he returned to compete in the fifth season of I Am a Singer where he finished fourth. Between July to October 2018, Li Jian served as a coach on the third season of Sing! China (a rebranded version of The Voice of China), where he became the winning coach on his season debut. In 2020, from August to November, he returned to Sing! China as a coach for its fifth season, ultimately winning a second time.

Education 
Li Jian received a bachelor of engineering with a major in electrical engineering from Tsinghua University in 1998. He took music courses at the Central Conservatory of Music when he was a student at Tsinghua University.

Discography

Accolades

Variety shows

I Am a Singer Season 3 
In January 2015, Li took part in the third season of the Hunan Television's singing competition I Am a Singer, where he finished as the runner-up.

Singer 2017 
In March 2017, Li returned as a returning singer of the fifth season of I Am a Singer, which was renamed to Singer on that same season. He once again made it to the grand finals, this time finishing in fourth place.

References

1974 births
Living people
Chinese male singer-songwriters
Chinese folk singers
Mandopop singer-songwriters
Musicians from Harbin
Singers from Heilongjiang
Tsinghua University alumni
21st-century Chinese male singers